Krishnendu Roy  is an Indian football defender who played for India in the 1984 Asian Cup. He also played for Mohun Bagan.

Honours

India
 South Asian Games Gold medal: 1985

He scored the only goal for India against Indonesia in Merdeka Cup in 1981, which took India to the semi finals

References

Stats

Living people
Indian footballers
Footballers from West Bengal
India international footballers
1984 AFC Asian Cup players
Association football defenders
Year of birth missing (living people)
Mohun Bagan AC players
Calcutta Football League players
Footballers at the 1986 Asian Games
Asian Games competitors for India
South Asian Games medalists in football
South Asian Games gold medalists for India